The Changhe Beidouxing (北斗星) or Changhe Big Dipper is a mini MPV produced by BAIC under the Changhe marque since 2004.

First generation (2004)

The Changhe Beidouxing was based on the same platform as the first generation Suzuki Wagon R+, and was originally an extended licensed production that turned into a rebadged model. The model is powered by a 97 hp 1.4-liter petrol engine sourced from Suzuki.

Changhe Beidouxing X5
The Changhe Beidouxing X5 is the long wheelbase version of the Changhe Beidouxing, featuring the second facelift front end of the Changhe Beidouxing, and a revised rear end with tail lamps on the D pillars. Prices of the Changhe Beidouxing X5 ranges from 41,900 yuan to 51,900 yuan. An electric version called the Beidouxing X5E was available as of 2016, featuring an electric motor with 41 hp.

Second generation (2019)

The Changhe Beidouxing II was seen in 2017, with the underpinnings still being the Suzuki Wagon R. The second generation Changhe Beidouxing is powered by the Suzuki-derived 1.4-liter engine shared with the first generation model, with the engine now tuned up to 101 horsepower. However, the actual production car was not revealed until 2019.

References

2020s cars
Cars introduced in 2010
Cars of China
Changhe Beidouxing
Mini MPVs